Senator Thornton may refer to:

Daniel I. J. Thornton (1911–1976), Colorado State Senate
Harry I. Thornton (1834–1895), California State Senate
John Thornton (U.S. politician) (1846–1917), U.S. Senator from Louisiana from 1910 to 1915
R. Ewell Thornton (1865–1928), Virginia State Senate
William L. Thornton (1844–1915), New York State Senate